Piro may refer to:

Piro languages, Arawakan languages of the Peruvian and western Brazilian Amazon
Piro language (Peru), a Maipurean language
Piro Pueblo language, a poorly attested, extinct Tanoan language of New Mexico